Winter league baseball is baseball contested in sports leagues during what is generally considered the baseball off-season.

Background
Annually, the highest level of professional baseball competition, Major League Baseball (MLB), begins with spring training and runs through completion of the World Series in the fall. Winter league baseball takes place in the months between the completion of the World Series and the start of the next season's spring training. As this spans winter in the Northern Hemisphere, winter baseball leagues are located in warm-weather areas such as Central America and the Caribbean, or, less commonly, in the Southern Hemisphere such as in Australia. In Australia, Baseball Victoria holds its own winter league between April and September.

Winter baseball provides an opportunity for prospects to build their skills or demonstrate their capabilities, or for established players to refine their skills or stay in shape. Many notable major-league players have played winter league baseball—during the 1954–55 winter season, the outfield of the Santurce Crabbers in Puerto Rico featured both Willie Mays and Roberto Clemente.

Leagues
Notable professional baseball leagues operating as winter leagues include:

Active
 Asia Winter Baseball League, located in Taiwan
 Australian Baseball League (ABL)
 California Winter League, formed in 2010, not to be confused with a defunct league of the same name
 Colombian Professional Baseball League (Liga Profesional de Béisbol Colombiano , LPB)
 Cuban National Series (Serie Nacional de Béisbol, SNB), restricted to players who reside in Cuba
 Dominican Professional Baseball League (Liga de Béisbol Profesional de la República Dominicana, LIDOM)
 Liga de Béisbol Profesional Roberto Clemente (LBPRC), formerly the Puerto Rico Baseball League (PRBL)
 Mexican Pacific League (Liga Mexicana del Pacífico, LMP)
 Panamanian Professional Baseball League (Béisbol Profesional de Panamá), commonly known as Probeis
 Venezuelan Professional Baseball League (Liga Venezolana de Béisbol Profesional , LVPB)

Champions of leagues based in and around the Caribbean meet annually in the Caribbean Series, normally contested in February.

Defunct
 Arizona Winter League, operated 2007–2012 and 2016–2018
 California Winter League, operated circa 1900 to 1947
 Cuban League, operated 1878 to 1961
 Hawaii Winter Baseball, operated 1993–1997, 2006–2008
 Maryland Fall Baseball, operated 1998
 California Fall League, operated 1999
 Texas Winter League, operated circa 2012–2013

See also
 Arizona Fall League, an offseason league operated by Major League Baseball featuring top prospects in Minor League Baseball
 Winter Meetings, an annual meeting of Major League Baseball executives to discuss league business and conduct trades and transactions

References

Furter reading

External links
 Offseason Leagues at MLB.com